Richard Dickson may refer to:
 Richard Dickson (American football), American football player
 Richard Watson Dickson (1759–1824), physician and agriculturalist
 Richard Dickson (curler), Scottish curler
 Rick Dickson, athletic director
 Richard Dickson (1792–1857), Scottish architect of R & R Dickson

See also

Richard Dixon (disambiguation)